Abdul Latif Biswas was a Member of the 2nd National Assembly of Pakistan as a representative of East Pakistan.

Career
Biswas was a Member of the 2nd National Assembly of Pakistan.

References

Pakistani MNAs 1955–1958
Living people
Year of birth missing (living people)
Place of birth missing (living people)